Sister Carol Anne O'Marie, C.S.J., (August 28, 1933May 27, 2009) was a Roman Catholic sister in the Religious Congregation of the Sisters of St. Joseph of Carondelet. She was also a mystery writer.

She wrote eleven novels, whose protagonist is Sister Mary Helen, an elderly sister who solves crimes. Most of the books are based in San Francisco, California, where O'Marie was born. Sister Carol Anne also ran a shelter for homeless women with Sister Maureen Lyons in Oakland, California.

She died, aged 75, from Parkinson's disease on May 27, 2009.

Sister Carol Anne wrote Like a Swarm of Bees, published by Graphic Visions in 2010. She finished the manuscript shortly before her death. It was written to recall a prophecy and a promise spoken in 1805 by the Abbé Piron of Saint-Étienne, France, by which he foretold that the Sisters of St. Joseph would increase in number and "like a swarm of bees" spread everywhere.

Bibliography

Sister Mary Helen Mysteries
 Novena for Murder (Book 1), 1984
 Advent of Dying (Book 2), 1986
 The Missing Madonna (Book 3), 1988
 Murder in Ordinary Time (Book 4), 1991
 Murder Makes a Pilgrimage (Book 5), 1993
 Death Goes on Retreat (Book 6), 1995
 Death of an Angel (Book 7), 1997
 Death Takes Up a Collection (Book 8), 1998
 Requiem at the Refuge (Book 9), 2000
 The Corporal Works of Murder (Book 10), 2002
 Murder at the Monks' Table (Book 11), 2006

References

1933 births
2009 deaths
American mystery writers
Neurological disease deaths in California
Deaths from Parkinson's disease
People from the San Francisco Bay Area
Writers from California
Congregation of the Sisters of Saint Joseph
American women novelists
20th-century American novelists
20th-century American women writers
Women mystery writers
20th-century American Roman Catholic nuns
21st-century American Roman Catholic nuns